The PFA Fans' Favourites is a list of football players produced as part of the celebrations of the centenary of the Professional Footballers' Association in 2007. There is one entry for each Football League club's favourite player. In making the selection, the PFA canvassed the opinions of the supporters of present, and some former, league clubs about their Number One player.

Background

In 2007 the Professional Footballers' Association celebrated the centenary of the foundation of The Players Union by launching their "One Goal One Million" campaign. The campaign involved a whole year of celebratory fund-raising activities with the aim of raising £1 million to fully fund a new Children's Rehabilitation and Physiotherapy Unit at the University Children's Hospital, Manchester. Throughout the year the PFA ran a number of high-profile events involving current and former players and managers with the sole purpose of reaching the £1 million target. Events included a pro-celebrity golf event, race days and initiatives involving our younger supporters. On the anniversary of the day that the PFA was formed in 1907 – December 2 – there was a match between an England Legends XI, captained by Alan Shearer and managed by Terry Venables, against a World Legends XI captained by Gianfranco Zola and managed by Jürgen Klinsmann, culminating in a Gala Dinner in the evening involving a host of top entertainers.

List of players

Key
 GK — Goalkeeper
 RB — Right back
 FB — Full back
 LB — Left back
 CB — Centre back
 CH — Centre half
 HB — Half back
 MF — Midfielder
 RW — Right winger
 LW — Left winger
 FW — Forward

References

Lists of association football players